Brigadier Cyril Gordon Martin VC CBE DSO (19 December 1891 – 14 August 1980) was a British Army officer and an English recipient of the Victoria Cross (VC), the highest and most prestigious award for gallantry in the face of the enemy that can be awarded to British and Commonwealth forces.

Martin was educated at Clifton College He was 23 years old, and a lieutenant in the 56th Field Company, Corps of Royal Engineers, British Army during the First World War when the following deed took place for which he was awarded the VC.

On 12 March 1915 at Spanbroekmolen on the Messines Ridge, Belgium, Lieutenant Martin volunteered to lead a small bombing party against a section of the enemy trenches which was holding up the advance. Before he started he was wounded, but, taking no notice, he carried on with the attack which was completely successful. He and his small party held the trench against all counter-attacks for two and a half hours until a general withdrawal was ordered.

He later achieved the rank of Brigadier and served during World War II. Martin was with the Northern Command in India in 1939 as Deputy Chief Engineer. He served in Iraq in 1941 as Chief Engineer, British troops. From 1945-47 he was Chief Engineer with the North-West Army, India. During this time he was also ADC to King George VI.

His Victoria Cross is displayed at the Royal Engineers Museum, Chatham, Kent.

References

Monuments to Courage (David Harvey, 1999)
The Register of the Victoria Cross (This England, 1997)
The Sapper VCs (Gerald Napier, 1998)
VCs of the First World War - The Western Front 1915 (Peter F. Batchelor & Christopher Matson, 1999)

External links
Royal Engineers Museum Sappers VCs
Generals of World War II

1891 births
1980 deaths
People from Fuzhou
British Army brigadiers of World War II
People educated at Clifton College
British World War I recipients of the Victoria Cross
Companions of the Distinguished Service Order
Commanders of the Order of the British Empire
Royal Engineers officers
British Army personnel of World War I
British Army recipients of the Victoria Cross
British expatriates in China